is the fourth 3D game in SNK Playmore's Samurai Shodown series of fighting games, and the eleventh overall title in the series. The arcade version was released in most other countries as Samurai Shodown: Edge of Destiny, and Shi Hun: Mingyun zhi Ren (侍魂 -命運之刃-, lit. Samurai Spirits: Edge of Destiny) in China. The Xbox 360 version was released elsewhere as Samurai Shodown Sen.

Plot
The game takes place between the events of Samurai Shodown 64: Warriors Rage and Samurai Shodown: Warriors Rage.

Development
Development of this game was announced publicly at All Nippon Amusement Machine Operator's Union (AOU). A tentative release date was set for the end of 2007.  However, at the 2007 Tokyo Game Show, the date was pushed back, although it was suggested that it was almost ready for release in Japanese arcades.

  After late October 2007, the game was subjected to rigorous beta testing around arcades in Japan.

On December 13, 2007, the official website to accompany the game was created, along with a bulletin of four locations sites: Tokyo, Kanagawa, Osaka, and Chiba. Testing began on December 20 and ended on December 24. The official website also confirmed an eventual release in 2008. The first overseas location testing took place in Hong Kong during December 20–21. Along with this announcement came the game's international title. Aoi Nanase, character designer to the series' first original video animation, reported in her personal blog that the official staff intended to make a great departure from the Makai and were aiming for a Sengoku period effect.

On February 9, 2008 the third location testing ad was listed on the Japanese official site at four different locations. Testing began February 14 and ended on February 19, intended to be the final round of testing. Also at this time, a tentative release date was listed as "Spring 2008" (later than the previously stated release date) in Japanese arcades on the Hong Kong SNK Playmore site.

On March 3, 2008 an English location test was announced for the US. The test was a one-day event from noon until 6:00 on March 8. Director of SNK Neogeo USA Consumer's Marketing Department, Mark Rudolph, said eventual home release was anticipated to be made on current next gen consoles. Similar beta testing was also performed in Mexico on March 14.

The main artist for the Samurai Shodown 64 series and Samurai Shodown: Warriors Rage, Senri Kita, is the official illustrator for this game.

Reception

GameZone's Dakota Grabowski gave the game a 4.5 out of 10, opining that "after hours upon hours of competitive gameplay, Samurai Shodown: Sen didn’t serve enough entertainment value to satisfy my tastes. It’s a shame since the series has long been one of the most popular franchises among hardcore fighting fans."

References

External links
 

2008 video games
Arcade video games
Fighting games
3D fighting games
Samurai Shodown video games
SNK Playmore games
NESiCAxLive games
Video games about samurai
Video games developed in Japan
Xbox 360 games
Video game sequels
Video game prequels
Interquel video games
Rising Star Games games